Orquídea Negra is the sixth solo album by Brazilian musician Zé Ramalho. It was released in 1983. The album featured several guest artists. Ramalho, who believes in extra and intraterrestrial beings, once said that a man who introduced himself as a member of the Illuminati told him that with the song "Kryptônia" they managed to make contact with some "species".

Track listing

2003 Re-issue

Personnel 
 Zé ramalho - Lead vocals, acoustic guitar, twelve-string guitar, caxixi, violas, bass drum, pandeiro, triangle.

References 

1983 albums
Zé Ramalho albums
Epic Records albums